Arthur Harrison (22 January 1862 – 22 August 1922) FRIBA was an architect based in Birmingham, England.

Life
Arthur Harrison was born in Nottingham on 22 January 1862. He trained with William Martin and John Henry Chamberlain in Birmingham before moving as assistant to George A Cox in 1885. He commenced independent practice in Birmingham in 1888. He was elected FRIBA in 1902 as a result of being President of the Birmingham Architectural Association. He was also President of the Rotary Club of Birmingham.

He died on 22 August 1922.

Works

28-34 Albert Street, Birmingham. 1888
Hall Green Junior School, Stratford Road, Hall Green, Birmingham 1892 - 1893
Morton Hall,123 Main Street, Newmilns, Kilmarnock 1896
Yardley District Council House 1898 - 1902
Artisans' Dwellings (Colmore Estate Dwellings), Hospital Street, Birmingham. 1900
St Christopher's Church, Springfield 1907
Digbeth Institute, Birmingham 1906 - 1908
Nechells Baths, Birmingham 1910
St Thomas' Schools, Granville Street, Birmingham 1915 - 1917

References

1862 births
1922 deaths
Architects from Nottingham
Fellows of the Royal Institute of British Architects
Architects from Birmingham, West Midlands